Gabriel Lüchinger (born 18 December 1992) is a Swiss professional footballer who plays as a midfielder for Greek Super League 2 club Apollon Smyrnis.

External links
 

Swiss men's footballers
Austrian Football Bundesliga players
Swiss Challenge League players
2. Liga (Austria) players
FC St. Gallen players
FC Wil players
FC Balzers players
SC Rheindorf Altach players
SV Ried players
1992 births
Living people
Association football midfielders
Expatriate footballers in Liechtenstein
Expatriate footballers in Austria
Swiss expatriate footballers
Swiss expatriate sportspeople in Liechtenstein
Swiss expatriate sportspeople in Austria
People from Altstätten
Sportspeople from the canton of St. Gallen